Endoscopy is a monthly peer-reviewed medical journal published by Thieme Medical Publishers on behalf of the European Society of Gastrointestinal Endoscopy. The journal covers all aspects of gastrointestinal endoscopy and also publishes ESGE guidelines and an annual review of the most recent literature, Endoscopy Essentials. Since 2013, the editor-in-chief has been Peter D. Siersema (University Medical Center Utrecht).

Abstracting and indexing 
The journal is abstracted and indexed in Index Medicus/MEDLINE/PubMed, Current Contents/Clinical Medicine, Current Contents/Life Sciences, Science Citation Index, Embase, and Scopus. According to the Journal Citation Reports, the journal has a 2020 impact factor of 7.341.

References

External links 
 

Gastroenterology and hepatology journals
Monthly journals
Publications established in 1961
English-language journals
Thieme academic journals